Arbab Niaz Stadium (Pashto: ارباب نياﺯ سټيډيم), formerly known as Shahi Bagh Stadium (Pashto: شاهي باغ سټيډيم), is a cricket stadium in Peshawar, Pakistan. It is owned by Khyber Pakhtunkhwa Cricket Association (KPCA).

History 
Arbab Niaz Stadium was constructed in 1984. In 1985 it replaced the Peshawar Club Ground which was the home ground for the Khyber Pakhtunkhwa cricket team since 1938. In 1986 the stadium replaced the Peshawar Club Ground for the Peshawar cricket team which was also using the same venue as a home ground since 1956. The stadium hosted international cricket between 1984 and 2006, including 15 One Day Internationals (ODIs) and 6 Test matches.

Final international matches

Due to terrorist attacks in Pakistan, including the 2002 Karachi bus bombing and the 2002 US consulate bombing in Karachi, international cricket teams refused to tour parts of Pakistan. Arbab Niaz Stadium was one of the stadiums teams did not want to play at, because Peshawar was close to the War in Afghanistan. In 2003, the South African national cricket team toured Pakistan. Arbab Niaz Stadium was scheduled to host the 3rd match of a Test series between Pakistan and South Africa, but ahead of the tour, the Union Cricket Board of South Africa (UCB) requested that this match be moved due to security concerns. Initially the Pakistan Cricket Board (PCB) tried to keep the original schedule in place, but following a bomb blast in Karachi on the eve of the tour, the PCB acquiesced to the UCB's demands. The Test series was shortened to two matches and Arbab Niaz Stadium did not host any matches. Between the beginning of the war on terror in 2001 and the end of 2005, Arbab Niaz Stadium only hosted three Pakistan matches: a Test match against Bangladesh in 2003, and two ODIs against India and Zimbabwe in 2004.

The last international match to be played at Arbab Niaz Stadium was against India in February 2006. An Indian delegation met with local law enforcement in Peshawar in December 2005 and decided that the security measures were adequate for India and Pakistan to play an ODI against each other in the city. The match was played on 6 February 2006. The match was shortened due to poor light, and Pakistan won by 7 runs (the Duckworth-Lewis method for adjusting scores was used to determine the result). During the match a large number of spectators barged onto the field, which led Chris Broad (the ICC match referee) to express unhappiness at the lack of security measures in place. The ICC's other objections to the stadium included its lack of floodlights and the poor quality of the dressing rooms and training facilities provided for playing teams. The poor facilities were a result of neglect from the provincial government which controlled the stadium. The PCB intended to continue using the stadium for international cricket, but sought to take over control of the stadium from the local administration. However, after continuing terrorist attacks in Pakistan international teams refused to play cricket in Pakistan altogether, and as of 2023 no further international matches have been played at the stadium.

Renovation efforts

The provincial government of Khyber Pakhtunkhwa decided to upgrade the stadium in 2017 to help bring international cricket back to the city. The renovations were to include an increased capacity of 35,000 (up from of 14,000), floodlights, a new electronic scoreboard, and better facilities for players modeled on Dubai International Cricket Stadium. The government initiated the renovations in 2018 with a completion date of 18 October 2021, through a contract worth Rs1.4 billion. The renovations were not completed in time and in December 2022 a government official reported the new completion date as being in June 2023, subject to funding, and the total cost of the project had grown to Rs2 billion. A 2022 report from the Planning and Development Department found irregularities in the project and said that the contractor was unqualified to complete the work.

The state of Arbab Niaz Stadium's renovations became a point of conflict between the PCB and local administration. In 2022, Peshawar Zalmi owner Javed Afridi claimed that the stadium's renovations would be complete in time to host Peshawar's matches in the 2023 Pakistan Super League. However, security forces did not declare the venue suitable for international cricket, and PCB chairman Ramiz Raja stated that the stadium would not be a high enough standard to host PSL matches.

References

External links

Test cricket grounds in Pakistan
Stadiums in Pakistan
Cricket grounds in Pakistan
Sport in Peshawar
1987 Cricket World Cup stadiums
1996 Cricket World Cup stadiums
Sport in Khyber Pakhtunkhwa